The Aviator's Wife is a 1981 French romantic comedy-drama film written and directed by Éric Rohmer. The film stars Philippe Marlaud, Marie Rivière and Anne-Laure Meury. Like many of Rohmer's films, it deals with the ever-evolving love lives of a group of young Parisians. 
 
The film is the first instalment in Rohmer's "Comedies & Proverbs" series—a collection of six films the director made during the 1980s. Each of these films begins with a proverb, in the case of The Aviator's Wife this is: "On ne saurait penser à rien" or "It is impossible to think about nothing".

Plot
Twenty-year-old François is in love with the fiercely independent 25-year-old Anne. One morning, Anne's airline-pilot ex, Christian, visits her to tell her that it is over between them and that he will return to his wife. François just happens to see the two leave Anne's building together and becomes obsessed by the idea that she is cheating on him.

As he strolls aimlessly through the streets of Paris, he catches sight of Christian in a café with another woman. As they leave and jump on a bus, François decides to follow them. A 15-year-old girl he has never met, Lucie, figures out what he is up to and playfully joins in with his amateur espionage.

Throughout the day, their stories and explanations for Christian's action become increasingly complex and outlandish. Eventually, they lose track of Christian in a taxi and they both leave, promising to write to each other if they ever discover what Christian was really up to. François returns to Anne where he learns that all was not as it seemed between Christian and the blonde woman.

Later that night, François goes to Lucie's flat seemingly to place a postcard in her mailbox directly, saving money on a stamp. He spots Lucie embracing a young man (who is coincidentally a co-worker of François'), obviously returning from a date. He leaves, although stops on the way home to buy a stamp and posts the postcard to her.

Cast

Background
After completing his "Six Moral Tales" series in 1972 with Love in the Afternoon, Rohmer spent the remainder of the decade filming historical literary adaptations, such as The Marquise of O (1976) and Perceval le Gallois (1978). At the beginning of the next decade, the director returned to writing his own material and The Aviator's Wife is the first of the "Comedies & Proverbs" series.

Reception
On Rotten Tomatoes the film has an approval rating of 90% based on reviews from 10 critics.

Roger Ebert praised the film, particularly the acting, giving it 3.5 out of 4. Dave Kehr of the Chicago Reader called it "A perfect film." Janet Maslin of The New York Times gave the film a positive review, but notes that there is a lot of talk, and that characters "express their fears and wishes in a relatively simple fashion" and that this "makes the material seem thin."

References

External links
 
 

1981 films
1981 comedy-drama films
1981 romantic comedy films
1981 romantic drama films
1980s French-language films
1980s romantic comedy-drama films
Films directed by Éric Rohmer
Films produced by Margaret Ménégoz
Films set in Paris
Films shot in Paris
French romantic comedy-drama films
1980s French films